The Juan Fernandez Plate is a microplate in the Pacific Ocean. With a surface area of approximately 105 km2, the microplate is located between 32° and 35°S and 109° and 112°W. The plate is located at a triple junction between the Pacific Plate, Antarctic Plate, and Nazca Plate. Approximately 2000 km to the west of South America, it is, on average, 3000 meters deep with its shallowest point coming to approximately 1600 meters, and its deepest point reaching 4400 meters.

Discovery

The Juan Fernandez Microplate was first discovered in 1972 via seismicity charts, which showed semi-circular patterns at the Pacific-Nazca-Antarctica triple junction. This implied that shear zone was present that were inconsistent with existing plate theories in the area. The microplate, as it is known today, was first mapped and named in 1983, during a Sea Beam survey that specifically mapped the East Pacific Rise (EPR) between the Easter and Juan Fernandez microplates.

The first sonar mapping of the JF Microplate was performed in 1983. Shortly after, the RV Endeavor performed another geological survey defining the boundaries of the plate and clearly identifying the key features of the triple junction of which the Juan Fernandez Microplate is the center. Since then, the growth of the plate has been theorized to be influenced by spreading ridges between the Pacific and JF Plates, accretion onto the plate by the Nazca and JF shear zones, and compression of both the northernmost and southeastern points of the JF Microplate.

Morphology and geological history
This microplate is estimated to have formed approximately 3–4 Ma ago. Once one single spreading center, the East Pacific Rise at this location split in two and resulted in two separate spreading ridges between the Nazca Plate and the Pacific Plate. The two spreading ridges, along with the Chile Rise, bounded the JF microplate. These two spreading centers then accreted material onto the JF microplate until it grew into the recognizable shape it is today. As it grew, the northern boundary of the microplate most likely experienced compression due to extreme clockwise rotational force provided by the eastern shear of the Nazca Plate and the western shear of the Pacific Plate. As the Nazca plate has a close coupling to the northern boundary of the plate, rotation of the JF Microplate was at its peak during its beginning stages of formation nearing rotational speeds of 32° per Ma. However, approximately 2.5 Ma ago, the south-eastern tip of the microplate collided against a fracture zone within the Antarctic Plate thus causing compression of the microplate against the Antarctic Plate and therefore stagnating its rotational motion down to approximately 9° per Ma at approximately 1 Ma ago. The original couplings causing shear then changed from the Pacific-JF and Nazca-JF boundaries to the Atlantic-JF boundary and Nazca-JF boundaries. The past 1 Ma has not seen any significant change in plate rotation and growth rate since.

Rotation

Since the earliest surveys of the area, theories about the movement of the JF Microplate have evolved to include compression of the plate through rotational movement and also shear zones between two major plates and the JF Microplate driving this clockwise rotational movement. The Pacific Plate is estimated to have a spreading rate anywhere between 13 and 16 cm/yr in relation to the Juan Fernandez MicroPlate. This spreading ridge supplies magma to the west of the plate, acting as a lubricant. In the development stages of the microplate, the Pacific Plate also shared a coupled shear section to the south of the microplate and, together with the Nazca Plate, drove fast rotation of the microplate. Approximately 2.5 Ma ago the JF Microplate began decoupling from the Pacific Plate and coupling with the Antarctic Plate. The latter severely braked the rotational movement of the microplate. Now, the Nazca and Antarctica Plates, are the plates that share the current shear zones with transform faulting between them and the JF Plate. The Nazca Plate shears to the east while the Antarctica Plate shears relatively to the west, and this continues to drive the rotation of the microplate clockwise as well as consequential compression however at a much slower rate. Compression has been observed on the Juan Fernandez Microplate at the Pacific-Nazca-JF triple junction and the Nazca-Antarctic-JF triple junction, due to the slightly irregular shape of the plate which does not rotate perfectly about its center.

Possible future fates

Some researchers claim that as the triple Junction that the JF Microplate shares with the Pacific Plate and the Antarctic Plate shifts southwest, the plate will continue to have unimpeded clockwise rotational movement for the foreseeable future. Other researchers propose that due to the extent of compression between the JF Microplate and the Antarctic Plate, the microplate will accrete onto the Antarctic plate within the next million years and simply extend the triple junction between the Pacific, Antarctic, and Nazca plate to the current location of the Pacific-Nazca-Juan Fernandez triple junction.

References 

Geology of the Pacific Ocean
Tectonic plates